This is a list of characters in Sigrid Undset's tetralogy The Master of Hestviken.

As noted throughout the series, ties of kinship were a major feature of Norwegian social life, conferring various privileges and obligations, and Norwegians at all walks of life took care to keep track even of their more distant kin.

Olav's family

 Olav Audunsson, the Master of Hestviken
 Audun Ingolfsson, father of Olav
 Cecilia Björnsdatter, Danish wife of Audun and mother of Olav
 Queen Ingebjörg of Norway, friend of Cecilia
 Ingolf Olavsson, Olav's grandfather
 Ragna Hallkelsdatter, Ingolf's wife and Olav's grandmother
 Elk, Olav's horse at Frettastein
 Apalhvit, Olav's horse at Hestviken
 Kinfetch, the costly ornamented axe that Olav inherited from his father.  Olav Torgilsson, his great-great-grandfather was holding it when he died in battle.  At that time it was called 'Wrathful Iron'.
 Olav Ribbung or Olav Olavsson, great-grandfather of Olav
 Olav Torgilsson, father of Olav Ribbung and great-great-grandfather of Olav Audunsson  He was the first male of the line to live at * Hestviken.
 Tora Ingolfsdatter, wife of Olav Torgilsson and mother of Olav Ribbung
 Ingolf of Hestviken, father of Tora who died without a male heir
 Torgils Fivil of Dyfrin, father of Olav Torgilsson
 Astrid Helgesdatter of Mork, wife of Olav Ribbung 
 Helge Olavsson, son of Astrid and Olav Ribbung.  He was the brother of Olav Audunsson's grandfather Ingolf and of Torgils Foulbeard.  He fell at Nidaros with King Skule.
 Cecilia Olavsdatter, daughter of Olav Audunsson and Ingunn Steinfinnsdatter
 Ivar Staal, son-in-law of Olav Ribbung
 Halldis, wife of Ivar Staal and daughter of Olav Ribbung and Astrid
 Borgny the Nun, daughter of Olav Ribbung and Astrid
 Ingolf Alavsson, priest and twin brother of Olav Ribbung
 Nikulaus Arnesson, bishop who ordained Ingolf 
 Olav Ingolfsson "Half-Priest", son of Ingolf Alavsson
 Bergljot of Tveit, Olav Half-Priest's mother
 Kaare of Tveit, brother of Olav Half-Priest
 Erlend of Aasheim, brother of Olav Half-priest
 Torgils Foulbeard, son of Olav Ribbung and Astrid
 Aasa, Torgils mistress who cares for the child Olav Audunsson
 Herdis Karlsdatter, another mistress of Torgils  
 Jon of Stein, Herdis's husband
 Earl Alf Erlingsson of Tornberg, patron of young Olav Audunsson

Arne's family

 Sira Benedikt Bessesson, parish priest at Hestviken
 Astrid, Sira Benedikt's sister and mother of Torgils' illegitimate son Arne
 Arne Torgilsson of Hestbaek, illegitimate son of Astrid and Torgils
 Signe, Una, and Torgunn, daughters of Arne
 Baard Paalsson, husband of Signe Andresdatter
 Paal of Skikkjustad, father of Baard 
 Kaare Jonsson of Roaldstad, Astrid's husband and good stepfather to Arne

The Steinfinnsons

 Steinfinn Toresson of Frettastein, foster-father of Olav 
 Ingebjörg Jonsdatter, wife of Steinfinn
 Mattias Haraldsson, originally betrothed to Ingebjörg
 Jon Paalsson, father of Ingebjörg
 Ingunn Steinfinnsdatter, oldest daughter of Steinfinn and Ingebjörg and wife of Olav, the Master of Hestviken
 Tora Steinfinnsdatter, younger daughter of Steinfinn and Ingebjörg
 Hallvard Steinfinnsson, oldest son of Steinfinn and Ingebjörg
 Jon  Steinfinnsson, younger son of Steinfinn and Ingebjörg
 Tore Steinfinnsson of Hov, grandfather of Steinfinn Toresson
 Tore Toresson of Hov, father of Steinfinn Toresson
 Kolbein Toresson, illegitimate son of Tore Toresson, and Steinfinn's half-brother 
 Ivar Toresson, full brother of Steinfinn
 Einar Kolbeinsson, son of Kolbein and cousin of Ingunn
 Haftor Kolbeinsson, brother of Einar
 Hallvard, cousin of Einar and Haftor
 Borghild, sister of Hallvard

Sir Gaut's family

 Sir Gaut Torvardsson, friend of Kolbein and kinsman of Andres Plytt
 Lord Andres Plytt, member of the council that governs Norway while the King is underage
 Helga Gautsdatter, Sir Gaut's daughter
 Haakon Gautsson, son of Sir Gaut. Kolbein promised Ingunn to him but he married her sister Tora
 Steinfinn Haakonsson, son of Haakon and Tora

Ingunn's family at Berg

 Lady Magnhild of Berg, aunt of Ingunn, and the oldest of Tore Toresson's legitimate children
 Dagny and Margret, twin daughters of Lady Magnhild's foster-daughter
 Aasa Magnusdatter, wife of Tore Toresson and mother of Magnhild and Ivar.  She is Ingunn's grandmother and Arnvid's aunt. Aasa's mother was also named Ingunn.
 Viking Erlingsson, deceased husband of Magnhild
 Gudmund Jonsson, suitor for Ingunn at Berg

Arnvid's Family

 Arnvid Finnsson, Steinfinn's first cousin and friend of Olav.  Tore Toresson of Hov married Arnvid's father's sister Aasa Magnusdatter; Arnvid is a good singer.
 Tordis, Arnvid Finnsson's wife. She was originally promised to Magnus, the oldest of the Finnsson's.
 Magnus, Finn, and Steinar,  three sons of Arnvid
 Hillebjörg of Elfardal, Arnvid's mother
 Guttorm, Arnvid's old henchman who "might be called his foster father"
 Sven Birgersson, friend of Arnvid

Olav's family in Denmark

 Erik Eriksson of Hövdinggaard in Denmark, Olav's maternal uncle
 Barnim Eriksson of Hövdinggard, Olav's maternal uncle
 Stig Björnsson, Olav's maternal uncle.  
 Margrete, mother of Cecilia Björnsdatter, Erik Eriksson, Barnim, and Stig.  She had two husbands: Erik first, and then Björn.
 Helge of Tveit, a descendant of Olav's great-grandfather
 Ingolf Helgesson and Jon Helgesson of Tveit, the two sons of Helge
 Ketillög, young woman who is befriended by Olav Audunsson in Denmark

Clergy, servants, neighbors, tradespeople

 Lord Torfinn, Bishop of Hamar, later canonized (a historical character)
 Asbjörn All-Fat, priest who serves Lord Torfinn
 Brother Helge, cleric at the Bishop's house
 Sira Hallbjörn, parish priest at Hestviken after Sira Benedikt
 Brother Stefan, priest who came to Hestviken as Ingunn lay dying
 Grim, bailiff at Frettastein and later a servant at Berg
 Dalla, sister of Grim and servant at Frettastein and later at Berg
 Jon, blacksmith in the town of Hamar
 Brother Vegard, priest of Hamar who visits Frettastein
 Gudrid, elderly neighbor of Olav Audunsson at Hestviken.  
 Björn Egilsson, husband of Gudrid; he becomes Olav's steward and squire.
 Gunnar, Björn's neighbor whom he kills in anger
 Tore of Hvitastein, Björn's former employer
 Torhild Björnsdatter, daughter of Björn and stepdaughter of Gudrid.  She becomes a servant at Hestviken and is the mother of Olav Audunsson's son Björn.
 Ketil, foreman at Torhild's farm, later Torhild's husband
 Arnketil, or Anki, Olav's servant at Hestviken
 Stein, Olav's neighbor at Hestviken
 Leif, steward at Hestviken after Björn
 Claus Wiephart, Olav Audunsson's German trading partner and skilled physician
 Richard Platemaster, English armourer who married a Norwegian girl and settled in Oslo
 Torodd and Galfrid Richardson, the two sons of Richard Platemaster

Eirik's family

 Eirik Olavsson, Son of Ingunn Steinfinnsdatter by Teit Hallson, presumed to be son of Olav Audunsson
 Teit Hallsson the Icelander, clerk to the sheriff's officer and father of Ingunn's illegitimate son Eirik
 Sira Hall Sigurdsson, priest and father of Teit
 Hallveig, Eirik's foster-mother
 Torgal, Hallveig's husband

The Bersessons

 Eldrid Bersesdatter, Wife of Eirik Olavsson
 Berse of Eiken, Father of Eldrid
 Kaare Bersesson, Eldrid's younger brother
 Gunhild Bersesdatter, Eldrid's sister

Veterans and rulers from the war with Denmark

 Asger Magnusson, distant kin of Olav Audunsson and his commander in the war 
 Duke Haakon, father of Tore Haakonsson and brother of King Eirik of Norway
 King Eirik of Norway
 King Eirik Valdemarsson, grandfather of King Eirik and Duke Haakon
 Constable Stig Andersson, a Danish lord and enemy in the War
 Count Jacob, Danish lord and enemy in the war

People from conflicts in 12th century Norway

 Sverre Prest (Sverre Priest), also known as Sverre of Norway.  He was King of Norway and enemy of the men of Hestviken
 King Magnus Erlingsson of Norway, friend of the men of Hestviken.
 The followers of Sverre were called Birchlegs or Birkebeinere. They killed Olav Torgilsson at the Battle of Oslo and burned Hestviken.  It had not yet been restored when Olav Audunsson took up residence there.
 The Bagler party opposed Sverre and allied with the church and "old nobility" of Norway
 The Ribbungs (named for their leader Sigurd Ribbung) were loyal to the Church party and opposed Sverre and the Birchlegs
 King Skule of Norway (Skule Bårdsson) fought against the Ribbungs.  There were Hestviken men on both sides of the battle.  In the end, however, Olav Ribbung and his sons supported King Skule.

Norwegian books